The 2005 Tonga rugby union tour of Italy and France was a series of rugby union matches played in November 2005 in Italy and France by Tonga national rugby union team.

It was a tour with heavy losses, with only a victory in the opening match with the Italian second team.

Results

Italy: 15. Ezio Galon, 14. Mirco Bergamasco, 13. Gonzalo Canale, 12. Cristian Stoica, 11. Ludovico Nitoglia, 10. Ramiro Pez, 9. Paul Griffen, 8. Josh Sole, 7. Aaron Persico, 6. Sergio Parisse, 5. Marco Bortolami (c), 4. Carlo Del Fava, 3. Carlos Nieto, 2. Carlo Festuccia, 1. Andrea Lo Cicero, – Replacements: 16. Matías Agüero, 17. Fabio Ongaro, 18. Valerio Bernabò, 19. Alessandro Zanni, 20. Luciano Orquera, 21. Maurizio Zaffiri, 22. Pablo Canavosio 
Tonga: 15. Sila Va'enuku, 14. Suka Hufanga, 13. Sione Tuʻipulotu, 12. Rodney Mahe, 11. Salesi Finau, 10. Fangatapu 'Apikotoa, 9. Soane Havea, 8. Chris Hala'ufia, 7. Viliami Vaki (c), 6. Ma'ama Molitika, 5. Milton Ngauamo, 4. Inoke Afeaki, 3. Tonga Lea'aetoa, 2. Ephraim Taukafa, 1. Soane Tonga'uiha, – Replacements: 16. Vili Ma'asi, 17. Peni Fakalelu, 18. Fakataha Molitika, 19. Ueleni Fono, 21. Sikuti Vunipola, 22. Keni Fisilau – Unused: 20. Sioeli Nau

France: 15. Julien Laharrague, 14. Aurélien Rougerie, 13. David Marty, 12. Thomas Castaignède, 11. Vincent Clerc, 10. Yann Delaigue, 9. Dimitri Yachvili, 8. Sébastien Chabal, 7. Julien Bonnaire, 6. Yannick Nyanga, 5. Jérôme Thion (c), 4. Gregory Lamboley, 3. Sylvain Marconnet, 2. Raphaël Ibañez, 1. Olivier Milloud, – Replacements: 16. Sébastien Bruno, 17. Pieter de Villiers, 18. Lionel Nallet, 20. Thomas Lièvremont, 21. Frédéric Michalak, 22. Yannick Jauzion – Unused: 19. Rémy Martin
Tonga: 15. Sione Tuʻipulotu, 14. Pila Fifita, 13. Suka Hufanga, 12. Andrew Mailei, 11. Salesi Finau, 10. Elisi Vunipola, 9. Sioeli Nau, 8. Chris Hala'ufia, 7. Rodney Mahe, 6. Viliami Vaki (c), 5. Milton Ngauamo, 4. Fakataha Molitika, 3. Tonga Lea'aetoa, 2. Ephraim Taukafa, 1. Soane Tonga'uiha, – Replacements: 16. Vili Ma'asi, 17. Alani Maka, 18. Talite Vaioleti, 19. Ueleni Fono, 20. Soane Havea, 21. Fangatapu 'Apikotoa, 22. Epi Taione

References 

2005 rugby union tours
2005
2005–06 in European rugby union
2005–06 in Italian rugby union
2005–06 in French rugby union
rugby union
2005 in Oceanian rugby union
2005
2005